Catherine Leroux (born 1979) is a Canadian novelist who usually writes in French.

Life
Leroux was born  in Rosemère, Quebec in 1979 and she took philosophy as her degree. She was the Toronto correspondent of Radio Canada. Leroux's first novel, La marche en forêt, was published in 2011 and was a finalist for the 2012 Prix des libraires du Québec.

Le mur mitoyen followed in 2013, and was a finalist for the 2013 Grand prix du livre de Montréal and won the Prix France-Québec in 2014. She was a shortlisted nominee for the 2016 Scotiabank Giller Prize for The Party Wall, a translation of Le mur mitoyen by Lazer Lederhendler.

She published the short story collection Madame Victoria in 2015. The book won the Prix Adrienne-Choquette in 2016. An English edition translated by Lazer Lederhendler, also called Madame Victoria, was published in 2018.

At the 2018 Governor General's Awards, she was shortlisted for the Governor General's Award for English to French translation for Le saint patron des merveilles, her French translation of Mark Frutkin's novel Fabrizio's Return. At the 2019 Governor General's Awards, she won in the same category for Nous qui n'étions rien, her translation of Madeleine Thien's novel Do Not Say We Have Nothing.

In 2020, she published her third novel L'avenir, a fictional account set in Detroit, Michigan premised on the city having remained under French control until present times, under the name "Fort-Détroit".

References

1979 births
Living people
21st-century Canadian novelists
Canadian women novelists
Canadian novelists in French
21st-century Canadian short story writers
Canadian women short story writers
Canadian short story writers in French
Writers from Quebec
People from Rosemère, Quebec
21st-century Canadian women writers
Canadian women non-fiction writers
21st-century Canadian translators